Polypodium vulgare, the common polypody, is an evergreen fern of the family Polypodiaceae. Polypodium vulgare is an allotetraploid species, believed to have arisen by chromosome doubling of a sterile diploid hybrid between two ferns which are not known in Europe. The fern's proposed parents are the northern Asian and northern North American Polypodium sibiricum and western North American Polypodium glycyrrhiza. Biochemical data point to a species from eastern Asia as the second possible parent. The name is derived from poly (many) and pous, podos (a foot).
Polypody has traditional uses in cooking for its aroma and sweet taste, and in herbal medicine as a purgative and vermifuge.

Description
Polypodium vulgare, the common polypody, is a fern developing in isolation from along a horizontal rhizome. The fronds  with triangular leaflets measure . They are divided all the way back to the central stem in 10 to 18 pairs of segments or leaflets.

The leaflets become much shorter at the end of the frond. The leaflets are generally whole or slightly denticulated and somewhat wider at their base, where they often touch each other. They have an alternating arrangement, those on one side being slightly offset from those on the other side. The petioles have no scales.

The sori are found on the lower side of the fronds and range in colour from bright yellow to orange. They became dark grey at maturity.

Period of sporulation: July to September.
Mode of dissemination: anemochory (wind dispersal).

Geographical distribution
The common polypody occurs throughout western Europe and North Africa. It is also quite common in Scandinavia and Carpathian Mountains. It is an introduced species in New Zealand, that has begun to spread into the wild as an invasive species.

Habitat
This fern is found in shaded and semi-shaded locations. It is a lithophyte (grows on rocks), and is found growing in the moss on old walls, cliffs, cracks in rocks, and in rocky undergrowth; also as an epiphyte on mossy trees.

Uses
In cooking: The rhizome has a bittersweet taste. It has traditionally been used in some confectionery such as nougat for its aromatic properties. In 1971, a saponin, osladin was found in the roots and believed to be the compound responsible for the sweet taste as it elicits a relative sweetness 500 times sweeter than sugar (by weight).
Medicinal: The dried rhizome is used in herbal medicine as a purgative and vermifuge; these properties are due to the phytoecdysteroids in the rhizome.

Research
P. vulgare plays the primary role in understanding of plant stomata responses to humidity. The Otto Lange group at the University of Würzburg first showed that stomatal opening and closing was performed in response to environmental humidity with Lange et al 1971, and continued to use it to further illuminate stomatal-humidity responses in stomata-humidty-temperature dynamics in Lösch 1977 & 1979, and metabolic energy supply to fuel stomatal articulation in Lösch & Tenhunen 1981.

Gallery

Note
The name Polypodium vulgare is sometimes applied to the Polypodium virginianum (rock polypody). Licorice fern is also known as Polypodium glycyrrhiza.

References

Further reading
Plants of the Pacific Northwest Coast. Copyright 1994. Jim Pojar and Andy MacKinnon. Lone Pine Publishing, Vancouver, BC.
Ecan.govt.nz - Common Polypody
CT-botanical-society.org: Polypodium vulgare - Polypodium virginianum
Polypodium vulgare L. - Studies and uses in traditional medicine

External links
Den virtuella floran: Polypodium vulgare 

vulgare
Ferns of Europe
Plants described in 1753
Taxa named by Carl Linnaeus